The Roma tomato or Roma is a plum tomato popularly used both for canning and producing tomato paste because of its slender and firm nature.  Commonly found in supermarkets in some countries, Roma tomatoes are also known as Italian tomatoes or Italian plum tomatoes.

Roma tomatoes are grown in the United States, Mexico, Australia, and  Great Britain.

Types
The "Roma VF" variant is most common in seed catalogs as of 2007. It was developed by the USDA's Agricultural Research Service (ARS) scientists in Beltsville, Maryland, in the 1950s as a fusarium wilt-resistant cultivar.

While the Roma is an open-pollinated variety rather than a hybrid, it has been steadily improved to the point that most Roma tomato vines are verticillium- and fusarium wilt-resistant (thus the VF in the name).

Most commercial plum tomatoes sold in markets in the Western Hemisphere are Romas or related types. Smaller plum tomatoes about the size of cherry tomatoes are sometimes sold as "baby Romas". A smaller relative known as "Windowbox Roma" is sold as a tomato suitable for window gardens and hanging containers.

Description
Roma tomatoes are egg- or pear-shaped and red when fully ripe. They have few seeds and are a good canning and sauce tomato. While Roma is an open-pollinated variety, in general it is not considered an heirloom tomato.
Maturing in under three months, the plant itself grows to 1 meter (40 inches) in height and the single fruit weighs about 60 grams (2 oz).
The vines fruit heavily, making Roma a popular variety with gardeners who do a lot of home canning.

See also
San Marzano tomato
List of tomato cultivars

References

Heirloom tomato cultivars